No be confused article of Dhivehi in film and television.
No be confused article of Lao in film and television.

This is a list of films and television series that feature dialogues in a dialect of the Aramaic language and/or employ the Aramaic alphabet. It also contains such films or series that merely mention Aramaic persons or the term 'Aramaic'.

Films

 The Exorcism of Emily Rose
 The Vatican Tapes
 As Above, So Below
 Stigmata
 Fallen
 The Passion of the Christ
 The Order

TV series
 Two and a Half Men
 South Park
 The Vampire Diaries
 American Horror Story

Lists of films by language